Charles Dalrymple Lindsay (also spelt Lyndsay; 15 December 1760 – 8 August 1846), was Bishop of Killaloe and Kilfenora from 1803 to 1804 when he was translated to Kildare.

Life
Lindsay was the son of James Lindsay, 5th Earl of Balcarres and Anne Dalrymple. He was educated at Wisbech Grammar School and then the University of Glasgow, and in 1779 received a Snell Exhibition to Balliol College, Oxford, graduating B.A. 1783, M.A. 1786, and D.D. at Glasgow in 1804. He was chairman of the Wisbech Canal company.

He held the following positions in the church:
 Vicar of St Peter and St Paul, Wisbech, Isle of Ely, Cambridgeshire 1787–1795
 Vicar of Sutterton, Lincolnshire 1793–1803
 Rector of Tydd St Giles, Isle of Ely, Cambridgeshire 1795–1803
 Bishop of Killaloe and Kilfenora 1803–1804
 Bishop of Kildare 1804–1846
 Dean of Christ Church Cathedral, Dublin 1804–1846

Family
Linsday married firstly Elizabeth Fydell, daughter of Thomas Fydell , on 1 January 1790. They had three children:
 Charles Lindsay (1790–1855), Archdeacon of Kildare
 Elizabeth Frances Lindsay (1791–1812), married Sir Compton Domvile 
 Philip Yorke Lindsay (1795–1832)

Linsday married secondly Catherine Eliza Coussmaker, daughter of Evert George Coussmaker and Mary Heyward, on 2 June 1798. They had one child:
 George Hayward Lindsay (1799–1886)

Notes

1760 births
1846 deaths
Alumni of the University of Glasgow
Alumni of Balliol College, Oxford
Deans of Christ Church Cathedral, Dublin
19th-century Anglican bishops in Ireland
Anglican bishops of Kildare
Bishops of Killaloe and Kilfenora
Members of the Privy Council of Ireland
Younger sons of earls
Charles